Kolchugino is the name of several inhabited localities in Russia.

Modern localities
Urban localities
Kolchugino, Vladimir Oblast, a town in Kolchuginsky District of Vladimir Oblast

Rural localities
Kolchugino, Smolensk Oblast, a village in Vskhodskoye Rural Settlement of Ugransky District in Smolensk Oblast

Renamed localities
Kolchugino, until 1925, name of Leninsk-Kuznetsky, a city in Kemerovo Oblast